The Kulgachia railway station in the Indian state of West Bengal, serves Kulgachia, India in Howrah district. It is on the Howrah–Kharagpur line.

History
The Howrah–Kharagpur line was opened in 1900.

Tracks
The Howrah–Panskura stretch has three lines.

Electrification
The Howrah–Kharagpur line was electrified in 1967–69.

References

External links
Trains at Kulgachia

Railway stations in Howrah district
Kolkata Suburban Railway stations